Oleksandrivka is an urban-type settlement in Kramatorsk Raion in Donetsk Oblast of eastern Ukraine. The Kramatorsk Reservoir (Краматорське водосховище) extends to the western edge of the town. Population:

Demographics
Native language as of the Ukrainian Census of 2001:
 Ukrainian 21.58%
 Russian 78.42%

References

Urban-type settlements in Kramatorsk Raion